The Hersfeld Tithe Register (German: Hersfelder Zehntverzeichnis) is a list of the places and castles in the Friesenfeld Gau (territory) and in Hassegau, from which Hersfeld Abbey received tithes. The original document dates from between 881 and 887 or between 896 and 899, but no longer exists. The list is found in a transcript from the 11th Century, which is now in the Hessischen Staatsarchiv Marburg.

The tithe register is divided into four sections. Many placenames are duplicated and triplicated. 

The first part was apparently compiled between 830 und 860, and lists under 239 numbers a large number of placenames. 
The second part and subsequent parts were created during the abbacy of Abbott Harderat between 889 and 899 and was bound with the first part and lists 18 names, each of which ends in '-burg' 2. In the third part 13 places are listed and in the fourth 5 markets and 7 places are listed. 

Many modern placenames in the modern day German states of Thuringia and Saxony-Anhalt can be connected with a corresponding name in the register.

List of Places
"Haec est Decimatio quae pertinet ad sanctum Wigberthvm in Frisonoveld" 
(This the tithe which belongs to the blessed Wigbert in Friesenfeld) 
 [Al]bundesleba – Alvensleben, an abandoned village on the site of present-day Sangerhausen
 Rurbach – Rohrbach, a Cistercian monastery east of Oberöblingen
 Rebiningi – Oberröblingen
 Seobach – presumably Seebach, a burb of present-day Mühlhausen
 Enzinga – Einzingen, now a part of Allstedt
 Rebiningi – Niederröblingen (Helme)
 Gisilhus – Kieselhausen, an abandoned village to the west of present-day Sangerhausen.
 Sangerhus – Sangerhausen
 [R]eotstat – Riestedt, now a part of Sangerhausen
 Burcdorpf – Burgsdorf
 Niustat – possibly Nienstedt (now part of Allstedt)
 Suderhusa – Sotterhausen
 Niunburc – (Beyer-)Naumburg
 Grabanesdorpf – Grabesdorf, abandoned village near Beyernaumburg
 Liobolvesdorpf – Lobesdorf, abandoned village near present-day Sotterhausen
 Holdestedi – Holdenstedt
 Sineswinidun – Schweinswende, an abandoned village near Bornstedt
 Hildiburgorod – Klosterrode, now a part of Blankenheim
 Liudolvesdorpf
 Brunistat – Bornstedt (bei Eisleben)
 Sidichenbechiu – Sittichenbach, now a part of Lutherstadt Eisleben
 Uuinidodorpf – Wenthdorf, abandoned village near Osterhausen
 Osterhusa – Groß-Osterhausen
 Einesdorpf – Einsdorf, now part of Allstedt
 Midelhusa – Mittelhausen (Allstedt)
 Winchilla – Winkel (Helme)
 Uuolfheresstedi – Wolferstedt
 Brallidesdorpf
 Hornum
 Nigendorpf – Klosternaundorf, now part of Allstedt
 Osterhusa – Klein-Osterhausen
 Scrinbechiu – Rothenschirmbach, now part of Lutherstadt Eisleben
 Hornberc – Hornburg, Saxony-Anhalt
 Bisgofesdorpf – Bischofrode
 Hardabrunno – Erdeborn
 Dachendorpf – possibly a variant spelling for Neckendorf, Nachendorpf
 Helpide – Helfta, now part of Lutherstadt Eisleben
 Luzilendorpf – Lüttchendorf
 Scidinge – Burgscheidungen

 Leobedigasdorpf – Lipsdorf
 Budinendorpf – Bündorf (Wüstung)
 Ziuuinidum – Wenden, now part of Mücheln
 Rozwalesdorpf – possibly Rulsdorf or Schwötzschdorf

 Seoburc – Seeburg (Mansfelder Land)
 Rostenleba – Roßleben
 Alberestat – Alberstedt
 Guministi – Kunisch
 Rebiningi – Unterröblingen
 Budinendorpf – probably Bindorf

 Altstedi – Allstedt
 Meginrichesdorpf – probably Memleben or Weningenmemleben
 Stedi – Stedten (Mansfelder Land)
 Budilendorpf – Bottendorf (Roßleben-Wiehe)

 Bablide – Mönchpfiffel, now part of Mönchpfiffel-Nikolausrieth
 Mimileba – Memleben or Weningenmemleben
 Osperestat – Esperstedt (Obhausen)
 Miscawe – vermutlich Meuschau

 Eindorf – vielleicht Einsdorf
 Odesfurt – Oßfurt
 Scrabanloch – Schraplau
 Gerburgoburc – Korbesberg
 Wangen – [Klein-]Wangen
 Wodina
 Dachendorpf
 Heiendorpf – Hayndorf
 Fizinburc – Vitzenburg, since 2004 a part of Querfurt
 Scidinga – Kirchscheidungen

Castles 
„Haec sunt urbes que cum viculis suis et omnibus locis ad se perti[nentibus] decimationes dare debent ad sanctum Wigberhdym ad Herolvesfeld“ (These are the castles with their farmsteads and all localities which must give tithes to the blessed Wigbert in Herodsfeld)

 Helphideburc – Helfta Castle, now part of Lutherstadt Eisleben
 Niuuenburg – Beyernaumburg
 Altstediburg – Allstedt Castle
 Merseburg – Merseburg
 Scrabenlebaburg – Schraplau
 Bru[nstedibur]g- Bornstedt, Schweinsburg
 Seoburg – Seeburg
 Gerburgoburg – Korbesberg
 Vizenburg – Vitzenburg Castle in Querfurt
 Curnfurdeburg – Querfurt Castle
 Scidingeburg – Burgscheidungen Castle
 Uuirbineburg – Burgwerben
 Muchileburg – Mücheln
 Gozzesburg – Goseck
 Cucunburg – Kuckenburg, now part of Esperstedt
 Liudineburg – Lettin, now part of Halle (Saale)
 H[unlebab]urg – Holleben, now part of Teutschenthal
 Vuirbinaburg – eventuell Markwerben
 Suemeburg – eventuell Schanze bei Korbetha-Wengelsdorf oder eine unbenannte Anlage bei Kraßlau/Leina

Literature
 Georg Landau: Beitrag zur Beschreibung der Gaue Friesenfeld und Hassegau, In: Allgemeines Archiv für die Geschichtskunde des preußischen Staates, 1833, Band 20, S. 213–235
 Hermann Größler: Die Wüstungen des Friesenfeldes und Hassegaues, In: Zeitschrift des Harzvereins für Geschichte und Alterthumskunde. Band 11, 1878, S. 119–231.
 Hermann Größler: Die Bedeutung des Hersfelder Zehntverzeichnisses für die Ortskunde und Geschichte der Gaue Friesenfeld und Hassegaues, In: Zeitschrift des Harzvereins für Geschichte und Alterthumskunde, Band 7, 1874, S. 85–130.
 Hermann Größler: Die Abfassungszeit des Hersfelder Zehntverzeichnis, In: Zeitschrift des Harzvereins für Geschichte und Alterthumskunde, Band 8, 1875 S. 302–310
 Otto Dobenecker: Regesta diplomatica necnon epistolaria historiae Thuringiae. Band 2 (1152–1227). Fischer, Jena 1900, S. 441 f. (Band 1, S. 64–67 ist damit überholt).
 Hans Weirich: Urkundenbuch der Reichsabtei Hersfeld, Band 19, Teil 1, Veröffentlichungen der Historischen Kommission für Hessen und Waldeck, Verlag N.G. Elwert, 1936, S. 65–67
 Ernst Eichler: Slavische Ortsnamen im Hersfelder Zehntverzeichnis. In: Wissenschaftliche Zeitschrift der Karl-Marx-Universität Leipzig, Gesellschafts- und sprachwissenschaftliche Reihe. Band 5, Heft 3, 1955/56, S. 305–309. Wiederabdruck in: Beiträge zur deutsch-slawischen Namenforschung. Leipzig 1985, S. 159–167.
 Heiner Lück: Das Hersfelder Zehntverzeichnis – eine wichtige Quelle für die frühmittelalterliche Geschichte des Saalkreises und seiner Umgebung. In: Heimat-Jahrbuch Saalekreis. Band 11, 2005, S. 12–18.
 Georg Waitz: Die Abfassungszeit des Hersfelder Zehntverzeichnisses. In: Zeitschrift des Harzvereins für Geschichte und Alterthumskunde. Band 8, 1875, S. 302 f.
 Siegmund A. Wolf: Zur Erklärung der Ortsnamen des Hersfelder Zehntverzeichnisses. In: Beiträge zur Namenforschung. Band 6, 1955, S. 292–314 (Nachträge Wolf, Beiträge 1957, 194 Anm. 3).
 Siegmund A. Wolf: Beiträge zur Auswertung des Hersfelder Zehntverzeichnisses. In: Leipziger Studien. Theodor Frings zum 70. Geburtstag (Deutsch-slawische Forschungen zur Namenkunde und Siedlungsgeschichte 5). Halle/Saale 1957, S. 192–235.
 Eberhard Eigendorf: Zur Siedlungskunde des Raumes Eisleben
 Erich Neuß: Besiedlungsgeschichte des Saalkreises und des Mansfelder Landes
 Christian Zschieschang: Das Hersfelder Zehntverzeichnis und die frühmittelalterliche Grenzsituation an der mittleren Saale. Eine namenkundliche Studie. (= Forschungen zur Geschichte und Kultur des östlichen Mitteleuropa, Bd. 52) Böhlau, Wien 2017,  (PDF )

References

Medieval documents of Germany